Mario Giordana (born 16 January 1942) is an Italian prelate of the Roman Catholic Church who worked in the diplomatic service of the Holy See from 1976 to 2017.

Biography
Mario Giordana was born in Barge, in the Italian province of Cuneo, on 16 January 1942. He was ordained a priest of the Diocese of Saluzzo on 25 June 1967. He earned a doctorate in canon law and entered the diplomatic service of the Holy See on 8 March 1976 and fulfilled assignments in Indonesia, in the offices of the Secretariat of State, in Switzerland, France, Austria and Italy.

On 27 April 2004, Pope John Paul II appointed him Titular Archbishop of Minora and Apostolic Nuncio to Haiti. He received his episcopal consecration in the Cathedral of Saluzzo on 29 May from Cardinal Angelo Sodano, Secretary of State.

On 15 March 2008, Pope Benedict XVI appointed him Apostolic Nuncio to Slovakia. His term as apostolic nuncio ended with the appointment Giacomo Guido Ottonello on 1 April 2017 to succeed him.

On 4 October 2017, Pope Francis appointed him a member of the Congregation for the Evangelization of Peoples and on 15 December 2018 a member of the Congregation for the Causes of Saints

On 29 June 2020, Pope Francis appointed him Extraordinary Commissioner for the Fabric of Saint Peter to lead a commission to reform its administration.

See also
 List of heads of the diplomatic missions of the Holy See

References 
 

Apostolic Nuncios to Haiti
Apostolic Nuncios to Slovakia
1942 births
Living people
People from the Province of Cuneo
Diplomats of the Holy See
20th-century Italian Roman Catholic titular archbishops
Pontifical Ecclesiastical Academy alumni
21st-century Italian Roman Catholic titular archbishops